Milak, Iran may refer to:
Milak, Dashtestan, Bushehr Province
Milak, Ganaveh, Bushehr Province
Milak, Qazvin
Milak, Sistan and Baluchestan

See also
Milaki, Iran (disambiguation)